Emil Molin (born February 3, 1993) is a Swedish professional ice hockey player who is playing for Brynäs IF of the Swedish Hockey League (SHL). He was selected by the Dallas Stars in the 4th round (105th overall) of the 2011 NHL Entry Draft.

Playing career 
Emil made his Swedish Hockey League (SHL) debut with Brynäs IF in the 2011–12 season. Molin recorded his first SHL point on December 10, 2011, an assist on a goal by Mads Hansen. He played a total of 44 games for Brynäs that season en route to claiming the Swedish championship.

On June 15, 2012, Molin was signed to a three-year entry-level contract with the Dallas Stars. He was loaned back to Sweden for three year following signing with the Stars which he spent with Brynäs, Mora IK, Almtuna IS and Rögle BK, gaining playing time in the Swedish Hockey League as well as in the HockeyAllsvenskan. He then made his way to North America to fulfil to the final year of his contract for the 2015–16 campaign. He spent the entire season with Dallas' farmteams: Molin played eleven games tallying three points for the Texas Stars in the American Hockey League and saw mostly playing time with ECHL's Idaho Steelheads. Molin appeared in 54 ECHL regular season contests, recording 22 goals and 24 assists, as well as in seven postseason games with four points.

In May 2016, Modo Hockey of the HockeyAllsvenskan announced that Molin would return to Sweden and had signed a deal with the team.

Molin played two seasons with Modo in the Allsvenskan, leading the league in scoring, before returning to the SHL prior to the 2018–19 season, agreeing to a two-year contract with the Malmö Redhawks on 13 April 2018.

Personal info 
Emil's father, Ove Molin, played professionally with Brynäs for 18 seasons.

Career statistics

Regular season and playoffs

International

References

External links

1993 births
Almtuna IS players
Brynäs IF players
Dallas Stars draft picks
People from Gävle
Idaho Steelheads (ECHL) players
Living people
Malmö Redhawks players
Modo Hockey players
Mora IK players
Rögle BK players
Swedish ice hockey centres
Texas Stars players
Sportspeople from Gävleborg County